Sundown Valley is a 1944 American Western film directed by Benjamin H. Kline and written by Luci Ward. The film stars Charles Starrett, Dub Taylor, Jeanne Bates and Jimmy Wakely. The film was released on March 23, 1944, by Columbia Pictures.

Plot

Cast          
Charles Starrett as Steve Denton
Dub Taylor as Cannonball Boggs
Jeanne Bates as Sidney Hawkins
Jimmy Wakely as Jimmy Holman
Jessie Arnold as Mom Johnson
Clancy Cooper as Hodge Miller
Jack Ingram as Bart Adams
Wheeler Oakman as Cab Baxter
Joel Friedkin as Joe Calloway
Grace Lenard as Sally Jenks
Eddie Laughton as Tom Carleton
Forrest Taylor as "Gun-Sight" Hawkins
Bob Kortman as Gorman
Steve Clark as Dave
Budd Buster as Haines
Edmund Cobb as Franklin
Blackie Whiteford as Shane
Dick Hartman as Musician
W.J. Blair as Musician
Elmer Warren as Musician
Pappy Wolf as Musician

References

External links
 

1944 films
American Western (genre) films
1944 Western (genre) films
Columbia Pictures films
American black-and-white films
1940s English-language films
1940s American films